Saphenista praefasciata is a species of moth of the family Tortricidae. It is found in Costa Rica. It was first described in 1932.

References

Moths described in 1932
Saphenista